The Cassero Senese (English: Sienese Keep) is a 14th-century fortification located in Grosseto, Tuscany, Italy.

Built by the Republic of Siena, it survived the demolition of the Sienese fortifications ordered by Cosimo I de' Medici, Grand Duke of Tuscany in 1565 and was incorporated in the Bastione Fortezza (Fortress Bastion) of the Grosseto city walls.

Bibliography

External links

Castles in Tuscany
Buildings and structures in Grosseto
Fortifications in Italy
Tourist attractions in Tuscany